Libby Rees (born 28 November 1995, Ringwood, Hampshire) is an English author. Rees wrote the book Help Hope and Happiness when she was 9 years old. The book is a self-help guide on how to cope with a parents' break up. The first edition of the book was published in December 2005.

Her second book, also 60 pages, was At Sixes and Sevens, about progressing from primary school to secondary school.

Rees received media coverage including appearing on Richard & Judy and Good Morning America. She received three awards in 2006 for her writing and campaigning; as youth ambassador for Save the Children she was presented a special award by The Princess Royal for inspiring dramatic change in the lives of children.

Rees also sits on the Youth Board of the Children and Family Court Advisory and Support Service, making sure that children have a voice when it comes to representation in the courts.

References

External links 
 BBC News article

English self-help writers
English children's writers
1995 births
Living people
English people of Welsh descent
British child writers
People from Ringwood, Hampshire